Attavyros or Atavyros (Ατάβυρος) is the highest mountain on the island of Rhodes in the Dodecanese in Greece.  It rises to a height of 1,215 m. It lies to the south of the village of Embonas.

In Greek mythology Althaemenes founded an altar to Zeus Atabyrios on the mountain.  He was said to have chosen the site as the only point on Rhodes from which his homeland of Crete could be seen. The remains of the sanctuary can be seen near the summit.

Gallery

References 

Mountains of Greece
Rhodes
Mountains of the South Aegean
Landforms of Rhodes (regional unit)
Sacred mountains
Temples of Zeus
One-thousanders of Greece